Apayauq Reitan is an Iñupiaq dog musher from Norway.  She participated in the 2019 Iditarod as a rookie, finishing in 28th place in 12 days, 5 hours, 15 minutes, and 17 seconds. She also ran the Yukon Quest that year, also as a rookie. In 2022, she became the first openly transgender woman to compete in the Iditarod. She is a citizen of both Norway and the United States.

Early life 
Apayauq was born in c. 1998 in Narjordet, Norway. She often spent time travelling between the communities of Narjordet and Kaktovik, Alaska. She started mushing at age four at her family's tourism kennel, Hula Hula Kennel. She changed her name to match that of her grandmother after she had come out to her family. After doing so, she received her tavluġun, traditional Iñupiaq chin tattoos. She came out publicly on March 8, 2021, International Women's Day.

Organized Mushing 
Apayauq started organized mushing at age 15, when she ran the Femund Jr. 220km, later running it at age 16. Then, in 2017, she ran some more races, including the Kobuk 440. Her dad, Ketil Reitan, finished the Iditarod, after which Apayauq took the family's dogs back home.

2019 Iditarod And Yukon Quest 
In 2019, Apayauq, then about 21, became the third person to complete the Iditarod and Yukon Quest as a rookie in the same year.

2022 Iditarod 
Apayauq became the first openly trans woman to compete in the Iditarod in 2022. She won the red lantern in 37th place in 13 days, 8 hours, 39 minutes, and 13 seconds. During the Iditarod, Apayauq criticized the Alaskan school sports ban on transgender girls. Julie Smyth, another Iñupiaq woman, was also opposed to the ban, as Iñupiaq culture was more accepting of transgender identities, stating it is "common in many communities to be transgender".

References 

Inupiat people
Alaska Native people
Transgender sportswomen
Native American women

Year of birth missing (living people)
Living people
Transgender women
American LGBT sportspeople
Norwegian LGBT sportspeople
LGBT people from Alaska
Dog mushers from Alaska
21st-century Native American women
21st-century Native Americans